Nibaran Chandra Mukherjee (Nibaron Chôndro Mukharji) was a Brahmo reformer in India during the 19th century.

In the History of the Brahmo Samaj Sivanath Sastri wrote, “The advent of Babu Nibaran Chandra Mukherjee, whose name has been mentioned in connection with progressive Brahmoism in Calcutta, during the Sangat Sabha days of 1865-66, brought a tower of strength to the Brahmo cause at Bhagalpur. He took it up in right earnest and has borne aloft the banner since then, piloting the movement through various vicissitudes of fortune. Others have come and gone but he remains there true to the convictions formed in early youth. During the period of the Cooch Behar marriage controversy the Bhagalpur Samaj kept close to Keshub Chunder Sen’s section of the church, without however shutting its doors to workers of the other section.”

References

 Sastri, Sivanath, History of the Brahmo Samaj, vol. 2, 1911-12/1993, Sadharan Brahmo Samaj 
Sengupta, Subodh Chandra and Bose, Anjali (editors), 1976/1998, Sansad Bangali Charitabhidhan (Biographical dictionary) Vol I, p151, 

Brahmos
Bengali people

Year of birth missing
Year of death missing
19th-century Indian people
Indian social workers
Indian social reformers
Indian reformers
Social workers from West Bengal